Rachelle Anayansi Mozman Solano (born 1972) is an American visual artist working primarily in photography and video and a clinical psychoanalyst born in New York City. She currently works between New York and Panama. Mozman Solano's photographs and moving images simultaneously explore the relationship between storytelling, narrative fiction and documentary and the way that stories built on perception shape culture and condition behavior of individuals and environment.

Early life and education 
Rachelle Anayansi Mozman Solano is a first generation American and was born and grew up in New York City. She makes work between New York City and Panama. the country of her maternal family. Her parents met at Hunter College at CUNY shortly after both immigrating to the U.S. and were committed to the Trotskyist movement for many years. Her father was a Geologist who later became a Computer programmer and her mother worked for the New York City Department of Education. Her paternal grandparents were sample maker's, and moved to New York City to work in the garment industry. Mozman Solano graduated from Fiorello H. LaGuardia High School for Music & Art and the Performing Arts in New York City. She earned an MFA in Photography from Tyler School of Art at Temple University, where she studied with Coco Fusco, and a BFA from Purchase College at SUNY, where she studied with cinema and media studies historian Tom Gunning and artists Gregory Crewdson, Jo Ann Walters, Mary Lucier and Antonio Frasconi. Her artworks deeply engage in clinical psychoanalysis, she also has 14 years of psychoanalytic training from the National Psychological Association for Psychoanalysis, New York, and has worked as a clinical psychoanalyst from 2010 to 2017. She is currently teaching at School of the Museum of Fine Arts at Tufts University as a Professor of the Practice in Photography since 2018.

Art 
Mozman Solano's artistic practice explores how mythology, history, the psyche, and economics overlap and become part of the psychological and somatic experience. Mozman Solano's work addresses trauma as a consequence of racial supremacism, diaspora and subjugation, particularly in the experience of women. Her photographs and videos address narrative, and the exploration of narrative as shaped by perception. Her 2018 project Metamorphosis of Failure was inspired by a 2014 MoMA exhibition of the works of Paul Gauguin. Mozman Solano explored Gauguin's interest in racial purity against his biracial background, as well as the role of the museum in shaping cultural perceptions of him. This project also engages with a feminist critique by creating images of Gauguin's muses and their poses. In 2020 Mozman Solano will release her monograph Colonial Echo with Kris Graves Projects, bringing together two related bodies of work, Casa de Mujeres and La Negra as well as interviews. The work is based on her family biography, with Casa de Mujeres focusing on the experience and impact of colonialism in Panama, and La Negra addressing the time when her family migrated first to the American south, and then to New York City in the mid 1960s. The name for the title La Negra, comes from the nickname given to her grandmother by her family.

Mozman Solano has been awarded residencies at LMCC workspace, Smack Mellon, The Camera Club of New York, and Light Work, as well as a Fulbright Fellowship. Mozman Solano's work has been reviewed in The New York Times, Artnexus, The Village Voice, The Wall Street Journal. Her work has been published in Aperture Magazine, Vogue Italia, the Light Work annual Contact Sheet, Presumed Innocence, Exit magazine and numerous other publications.

Selected exhibitions

Individual exhibitions 

 2019 Metamorphosis of Failure, Smack Mellon, New York, NY
 2018 El espejo opaco de Gauguin, Arteconsult, Panamá, Panamá
 2010 Equivalent, Arteconsult, Panama City, Panama
 2010 Costa del Este, En Foco Traveling Exhibition program, Aguilar Library/NYPL, New York, NY
 2009 American Exurbia/Costa del Este, Festival Biarritz, Biarritz, France
 2009 Exurbia, Sol del Rio Arte Contemporánea, Guatemala City, Guatemala
 2006 American Exurbia, Metaphor Contemporary Art, Brooklyn, NY
 2003 New Photographs, PH gallery, New York, NY

Group exhibitions 

 2019 How to Read a Banana: A screening with Rachelle Mozman Solano & Nicole Won Hee Maloof, (screening), SOHO20 gallery, Brooklyn, NY
 2019 Yes: Rachelle Mozman Solano/Ezra Wube, (screening) Microscope gallery, Brooklyn, NY
 2018 Humble Cats:Photoville Edition, Photoville, Brooklyn, NY
 2017 Panamá Expandida, Museo de Arte Contemporáneo, Panamá, Panamá
 2016 X Bienal Centroaméricana, Museo Arte y Diseño Contemporáneo, San Jose, Costa Rica
 2015 Do/Tell, Institute of Contemporary Art University of Pennsylvania, Philadelphia PA
 2014 Portraiture Now: Staging the Self, National Portrait Gallery, Smithsonian Institution, Washington, DC
 2013 In the Zone, Station Independent Projects, New York, NY
 2012 You Are My Mirror, Athens Photo Festival, Ariadne Photo gallery, Athens, Greece
 2011 The (S) Files Bienal, El Museo del Barrio, New York, NY
 2010 Parábola: Una línea imaginaría entre mujeres fotógrafas, Centro Cultural España, San Salvador, El Salvador
 2009 Dialogues: Chapters of Latin American Art in the MOLAA Permanent Collection, MOLAA, Long Beach, CA
 2008 Numero Cero, 2nd Trienal Poligrafica de Puerto Rico y el Caribe, San Juan, Puerto Rico
 2007 Sutil Violencia, Instituto Cultural Itaõ, São Paulo, Brazil
 2006 IV Bienal Centroaméricana, San Salvador, El Salvador
 2005 Séptima Bienal de Arte Panamá, Museo de Arte Contemporáneo, Panamá, Panamá

Awards 
2019 NYSCA/NYFA Artist Fellowship
 2018 Neubauer Faculty Fellow
 2017 Latin American Roaming Art
 2016 NYC Film and Media Grant, Jerome Foundation
 2013 The Puffin Foundation
 2012 Critical Mass Photolucida, Top 50
 2012 Finalist, 86th International Competition in Photography, The Print Center, Philadelphia, PA
 2011 Lens Culture, 2nd Prize Winner

References 

1972 births
Living people
21st-century American women artists
Artists from New York City